The iPad 9.7-inch (officially iPad (6th generation)) is a tablet computer designed, developed, and marketed by Apple Inc. It was announced on March 27, 2018, during an education-focused event at Lane Tech High School in Chicago and is the successor to the 5th generation, upgraded with the Apple A10 Fusion SoC and support for styluses such as Apple Pencil. The iPad is also marketed towards educators and schools. It was replaced in September 2019, by the seventh-generation iPad. This is the last iPad to have the original 9.7 inch display.

Specifications 
The iPad shipped with iOS 11.3, and had the iWork suite of apps preinstalled and included Apple Pencil stylus support.

The iPad's hardware is nearly identical to the previous generation, except for a few upgrades, such as Apple Pencil and stylus support and an upgraded processor, the Apple A10 Fusion. It is available in three colors: Silver, Space Gray, and a new Gold color to match the updated color introduced with the iPhone 8. The iPad has 2 gigabytes of RAM. It is 7.5mm thick. The iPad is available in 32 and 128 GB storage options. Unlike the iPad Pro, the iPad does not feature a laminated display.

Reception 
The 2018 iPad received positive reviews. Gareth Beavis of TechRadar praised the addition of the Apple Pencil and the powerful A10 chip, but noted that it was as costly as the previous generation iPad. Scott Stein of CNET also praised the addition of support for Apple Pencil and the upgrade to the A10 chip, but criticized it for lacking the Smart Connector as well as not having the same display technology as the iPad Pro, writing "the 2018 entry-level iPad doesn't add much, but it makes an already excellent tablet a better buy than ever."

Timeline of models

Notes

References

External links

6
iPad (6)
Tablet computers
Touchscreen portable media players
Tablet computers introduced in 2018